Chengbei Subdistrict is a subdistrict of Yongji in southwestern Shanxi, People's Republic of China, occupying the northern portion of Yongji's urban area as its name suggests. , it has 3 residential communities (社区) and 19 villages under its administration.

See also 
 List of township-level divisions of Shanxi

References 

Township-level divisions of Shanxi